The following article outlines the awards and nominations received by Kenyan afro-pop band Sauti Sol. Formed in 2005, the band has since grown to become one of the most successful musical acts in Africa, gaining considerable attention, praise and recognition for their work.

While neither their debut studio album Mwanzo nor any of its songs were nominated for any awards, the group received a nomination for Best African Newcomer at the 2010 African Music Awards. They received their first major accolade the same year, winning Best Group at the Museke Online Africa Music Awards. In 2011, Sauti Sol was named Best Fusion Artist/Group of the Year at the Kisima Music Awards, while the music video for the song "Coming Home" from their second studio album Sol Filosofia won Best Music Video. The following 3 years saw them pick up a further 6 awards, most notably winning Best African Act at the 2014 MTV Europe Music Awards, becoming the first Kenyan musicians to receive the award.

In 2015, the release of their third studio album Live and Die in Afrika saw the group receive continued recognition. The song "Sura Yako" was nominated for 9 awards, winning Most Downloaded Single, Most Downloaded Afro-Pop Single and Most Downloaded Song at the Mdundo Music Awards, while its music video won YouTube Video of the Year at the Pulse Music Video Awards. The song "Nerea", featuring the duo Amos and Josh, also received numerous nominations, winning Best Collaboration of the Year at the Pulse Music Video Awards. The group was also nominated for Best International Act: Africa at the BET Awards, but lost out to Ghanaian musician Stonebwoy.

Abryanz Style and Fashion Awards

African Entertainment Awards

African Music Awards

African Muzik Magazine Awards

All Africa Music Awards
The All Africa Music Awards (AFRIMA), in conjunction with the African Union Commission (AUC), are designed to promote African music worldwide.

BEFFTA Awards

BET Awards
The BET Awards were established in 2001 by the Black Entertainment Television network to celebrate African Americans and other minorities in music, acting, sports, and other fields of entertainment over the past year.

Bingwa Music Awards

Chaguo La Teeniez Awards

Channel O Music Video Awards
The Channel O Music Video Awards are a pan-African awards ceremony organised annually by South African television network Channel O.

East Africa TV Awards

Google Recognition

HiPipo Music Awards
The HiPipo Music Awards (HMA) celebrates and promotes music, musicians, and artistic excellence in Uganda, with special categories for the rest of Africa.

The Headies Awards
The Headies, formerly known as the Hip Hop World Awards, are an accolade established in 2006 by the Hip Hop World Magazine of Nigeria to recognize outstanding achievement in the Nigerian music industry. The annual ceremony features performances by established and promising artists.

International Achievement Recognition Awards

Kilimanjaro Tanzania Music Awards

Kisima Music Awards
The Kisima Music Awards are held annually and recognise musical talent in East Africa (predominantly Kenya, Uganda and Tanzania).

Kora Awards
The Kora Awards are held annually to recognise outstanding musical achievement in sub-Saharan Africa.

Mdundo Music Awards

MTV Awards

MTV Africa Music Awards
The MTV Africa Music Awards are an annual award ceremony that celebrate and honour the most popular contemporary music in Africa.

MTV Europe Music Awards
The MTV Europe Music Awards are an annual award ceremony that celebrate and honour the most popular contemporary music in Europe.

Museke Online Africa Music Awards

Nigeria Entertainment Awards
The Nigeria Entertainment Awards are an annual event focused on recognizing the contributions of Nigerian (and other African) entertainers to the entertainment industry.

OLX Social Media Awards

Pulse Music Video Awards

Soundcity MVP Awards Festival
The Soundcity MVP Awards Festival is an event presented by Soundcity TV which awards plaques to musicians and performers across Africa.

tooXclusive Awards

Uganda Entertainment Awards

References
Notes

Citations

Sauti Sol